Cuban cuisine is largely based on Spanish cuisine with influence from African and other Caribbean cuisines. Some Cuban recipes share spices and techniques with Spanish, African and Taino cooking, with some Caribbean influence in spice and flavor. This results in a blend of the several different cultural influences. A small but noteworthy Chinese influence can also be accounted for, mainly in the Havana area. There is also some Italian influence. During colonial times, Cuba was an important port for trade, and the Spanish ancestors of Cubans brought with them the culinary traditions of different parts of Spain.

Overview
As a result of the colonization of Cuba by Spain, one of the main influences on the cuisine is from Spain. Other culinary influences include the Taíno, the indigenous people of Cuba, Africa, from the Africans who were brought to Cuba as slaves, and French, from the French colonists who came to Cuba from Haiti. Another factor is that Cuba is an island, making seafood something that greatly influences Cuban cuisine. Another contributing factor to Cuban cuisine is that Cuba is in a tropical climate, which produces fruits and root vegetables that are used in Cuban dishes and meals.

A typical meal consists of rice and beans, cooked together or apart. When cooked together the recipe is called "congri" or "Moros" or "Moros y Cristianos" (black beans and rice). If cooked separately it is called "arroz con frijoles" (rice with beans) or "arroz y frijoles" (rice and beans).

Cuban sandwich

A Cuban sandwich (sometimes called a mixto, especially in Cuba) is a popular lunch item that grew out of the once-open flow of cigar workers between Cuba and Florida (specifically Key West and the Ybor City neighborhood of Tampa) in the late 19th century and has since spread to other Cuban American communities.

The sandwich is built on a base of lightly buttered Cuban bread and contains sliced roast pork, thinly sliced Serrano ham, Swiss cheese, dill pickles, and yellow mustard. In Tampa, Genoa salami is traditionally layered in with the other meats, probably due to influence of Italian immigrants who lived side by side with Cubans and Spaniards in Ybor City. Tomatoes and lettuce are available additions in many restaurants, but these are considered by traditionalists as an unacceptable Americanization of the sandwich.

After assembly, the Cuban sandwich may be pressed in a grooveless panini-type grill called a plancha, which both heats and compresses the contents.

List of Cuban dishes and foods

 Arroz con leche
 Arroz con maiz
 Arroz con pollo
 Arroz a la cubana
 Bistec de palomilla
 Boliche
 Buñuelo
 Butifarra
 Camarones
 Camarones enchilados
 Casabe
 Chiviricos
 Churros
 Croqueta
 Cucurucho
 Dulce de leche
 Empanada
 Flan de calabaza
 Flan de coco
 Flan de guayaba
 Flan de huevos
 Elena Ruz
 Frijoles negros
 Frita
 Fufú de plátano
 Guayaba
 Lechón
 Majarete
 Medianoche
 Mermelada
 Mojo criollo
 Morcilla
 Moros y Cristianos
 Natilla
 Papa rellena
 Papitas fritas
 Pasteles
 Pernil
 Picadillo
 Platano maduro frito
 Pudín de pan
 Pulpeta
 Ropa vieja
 Sandwich Cubano
 Sopa de pollo
 Tamal
 Tortilla de patatas
 Tasajo
 Torrejas
 Tostada
 Tostones
 Tres leches cake
 Turrones
 Vaca frita
 Yuca con mojo
 Yuca frita

List of Cuban drinks

 Batido - Milkshake coming in flavors such as guanabana and trigo (wheat)
 Cafe Cubano - Cuban espresso
 Cuba Libre – Rum, Coca-Cola, sugar, and lime
 Daiquiri - Rum, Lime, syrup (variations with fruit)
 El Presidente
 Guarapo – juice made from pressed sugar cane
 Hatuey beer
 Ironbeer
 Malta (soft drink) – malt beverage
 Materva
 Mojito – Rum, mint, sugar, lime, and club soda
 Jupiña - pineapple soda
 Cortadito - Cuban espresso and steamed evaporated milk
 Carajillo - Cuban Espresso, Liquor 43
 Cuban Piña Colada - Aged rum, lime, pineapple, and sugar

See also

 Caribbean cuisine
 Flattop grill

References

Bibliography
 Aróstegui, Gonzalo, et al.: Manual del Cocinero Criollo, Cuba, 19th century.
 Buchmann, Christine. "Cuban Home Gardens and Their Role in Social–Ecological Resilience." Human Ecology: An Interdisciplinary Journal 37.6 (2009): 705–721. 16 Jan. 2010.
 Cancio-Bello, Carla. "The Growing Popularity of Cuban Cuisine." (2012): http://www.cubancuisine.co.uk
 Carris Alonso, Cynthia. "A Taste of Cuba: A Journey Through Cuba and its Savory Cuisine."  Apollo Publishers, 2018
Folch, Christine. "Fine Dining: Race in Prerevolution Cookbooks." Latin American Research Review 43.2 (2008): 205–223. 3 Feb. 2010.
 Hunt, Nigel. "The Agriculture History in Cuba." Cuba Agriculture. 2008. Web. 11 Feb 2010.
 Murray, James. "Cuban Cuisine, Cuba History and Their Food." 2009. Articlesbase. Web. 16 January 2010.
 Reyes Gavilán y Maen, Maria Antonieta: Delicias de la mesa. Manual de Cocina y Reposteria, 12ed., Ediciones Cultural S.A., La Habana, 1952.
 Rodriguez, Hector. "Cuban Food Profile: Cuban Food History." 2010. Latinfood.about.com. Web 16 January 2010.
 Villapol, Nitza: Cocina Cubana, 3ed., Editorial Cientifico-Técnica, Habana, 1992.
 Warwick, Hugh. "Cuba's Organic Revolution." Forum for Applied Research & Public Policy 16:2(2001): 54–58. 27 Feb. 2010.

Historical aspects of Cuban cuisine
 Brenner, Philip, Jimenez, Marguerite, Kirk, John, and Leo Grunde, William.  A Contemporary Cuba Reader:  Reinventing the Revolution. Rowman and Littlefield Publication.  2008.
 Harpers Weekly.  Starvation in Cuba.  The New York Times: May 30, 1897.
 Hernandez, Rafael.  Looking at Cuba:  Essays on Culture and Civil Society. University of Florida Press, 2003. P. 101
 Houston, Lynn Marie.  Food Culture Around the World: Food Culture in the Caribbean.  Westport, Connecticut: Greenwood Press, 2005. Pg. 115–116.
 Maria Josefa Lluria de O’Higgins.  A Taste of Old Cuba:  More Than 150 Recipes for Delicious, Authentic, and Traditional Dishes Highlighted with Reflections and Reminiscences. New York:  HarperCollins Publishers.  1994.
 Pieroni, Andrea and Price, Lisa L.  Eating and Healing: Traditional Food as Medicine.  New York, 2006. Haworth Press Inc.
 Randelman, Mary U. and Schwartz, Joan, Memories of a Cuban Kitchen: More than 200 classic recipes. New York:  Macmillan.  1992.

External links

 
Caribbean cuisine
Latin American cuisine